Reason and Truth is the first studio album by the Italian progressive power metal band Concept. The album was recorded in 2001 but mixed only in the end of 2002, that caused a delayed release date in 2003. The album was previously published in Japan (August 15, 2003) by the label Hot Rockin.

Track listing 
 Elegy of Truth – 4:32
 Running like a Gosth – 4:37
 The Answer II – 0:59
 Living a Lie – 4:54
 Power after Power – 5:02
 Death of Reason – 7:24
 Spes Terzia – 4:25
 Alone (The Conversion) – 4:23
 Conceptsymphony (The Dialogue) – 9:39
 bonus: Sweet Dreams – 4:01
 bonus: From Ashes to New Life (Japan) – 5:38

Personnel 
 Mariano Croce - guitars 
 Andrea Mastroianni - keyboards
 Gianni Carcione - lead vocals
 Andrea Arcangeli - bass
 David Folchitto - drums

References

2003 debut albums
Concept (band) albums